The Brunei FA Cup is Brunei's premier knockout tournament in men's football. The current format is administered by the Football Association of Brunei Darussalam (FABD) since 2012.

The championship winner will receive B$10,000 and first runner up will get B$7,000 ($5,000 USD) as prize money.

Participation
Previously all football clubs that have registered with the NFABD were eligible to enter the FA Cup, including non-league teams such as FC Phosphor. Due to more stringent regulations, from the 2017 edition onwards only teams from the Brunei Super League and Premier League can enter.

2012 = 44 teams
2014/15 = 36 teams
2015 = 28 teams
2016 = 28 teams
2017 = 20 teams
2018/19 = 17 teams
2022 = 32 teams

Previous winners
Winners so far are: 
FA Cup (BAFA-administered)
2002 : Wijaya FC       1-0     MS ABDB
2003 : MS ABDB             3-0     Kota Ranger
2004 : DPMM FC          0-0     MS ABDB           [aet, 3-1 pen]
2005/06 : AH United        2-2     MS ABDB           [aet, 4-3 pen]
2006/07 : not held
2007/08 : MS ABDB             1-0    Wijaya FC
2008/09 : not held
DST FA Cup (FFBD-administered)
2009/10 : MS ABDB             2-1    QAF FC
DST FA Cup (NFABD-administered)
2012 : MS ABDB             1-0    Indera FC      [aet]
2013 : not held
2014/15 : MS ABDB             2-0    Najip FC
2015 : MS ABDB 3-2 Indera SC
2016 : MS ABDB 1-0 Najip I-Team
2017/18 : Indera SC 2-0 MS PDB
2018/19 : Kota Ranger FC 2-1 MS PDB
2020 : cancelled
2021 : not held
2022 : DPMM FC 2-1 Kasuka FC

References

Football competitions in Brunei
National association football cups